was a member of 

Aminata Haidara (born 13 May 1997) is an Ivorian professional footballer, who plays as midfielder   for Hatayspor in the Turkish Women's Super League. She was part of the Ivorian squad for the 2015 FIFA Women's World Cup.

Club career 
Haidara was a member of Onze Sœurs de Gagnoa in 2014–15.

She played two seasons in 2019 and 2020 for FK Niva-Belcard Grodno in the Belarusian Premier League and the Belarusian Women's Cup.

In October 2022, she moved to Turkey, and signed with Hatayspor to play in the 2022–23 Women's Super League.

International career 
As a member of the Ivory Coast national  team, Haidara took part at the 2015 FIFA Women's World Cup.

See also 
List of Ivory Coast women's international footballers

References

External links 
 
 Profile at FIF 

1997 births
Living people
People from Gagnoa
Ivorian women's footballers
Women's association football midfielders
Ivory Coast women's international footballers
2015 FIFA Women's World Cup players
Ivorian expatriate footballers
Ivorian expatriate sportspeople in Belarus
Expatriate women's footballers in Belarus
Ivorian expatriate sportspeople in Turkey
Expatriate women's footballers in Turkey
Turkish Women's Football Super League players
Hatayspor (women's football) players